"" is the second single by Shiori Takei and released May 19, 2004 under Giza Studio label. The single reached #90 rank first week. It charted for 1 weeks and sold over 1,292 copies.

Track listing

References

2004 singles
2004 songs
Japanese-language albums
Being Inc. singles
Giza Studio singles
Songs with lyrics by Nana Azuki